The 8th Lagos State House of Assembly is the legislative branch of the Lagos State Government inaugurated on June 8, 2015.
The assembly will run its course till June 3, 2019.
The assembly is unicameral with 41 representatives elected from each constituencies of the state.
The incumbent Speaker of the 8th Legislative Assembly is Rt. Hon Mudashiru Obasa and the Deputy speaker is Hon. Eshinloku Sanni.
The election of representative for the 8th legislative assembly was held on April 28, 2015.

Powers and duties
The legislative function of the Assembly is to make law by passing bills, which must be endorsed by the two-thirds majority of the house.
Following the endorsement by the two-thirds majority, the bill is presented to the Governor, who will sign the bill to become law.
The assembly also play a significant role in the appointment of the state commissioners, Chief judges and other top official by the governor.

References

2011 establishments in Nigeria
State lower houses in Nigeria